The 1st Siberian Rifle Division (1-ya Sibirskaya strelkovaya diviziya) was an infantry formation of the Russian Imperial Army that existed in various formations from the early 19th century until the end of World War I and the Russian Revolution. The division was based in Ussuriysk in the years leading up to 1914. It fought in World War I and was demobilized in 1918.

Organization 
The 1st Siberian Rifle Division was part of the 1st Siberian Army Corps. Its order of battle in from the Russo-Japanese War in 1905 to the outbreak of World War I in 1914 was as follows:
1st Brigade (HQ Nikolsk-Ussuriisk)
1st His Majesty's Siberian Rifle Regiment
2nd Adjutant-General Count Muravyov-Amursky Siberian Rifle Regiment
2nd Brigade (HQ Nikolsk-Ussuriisk)
3rd Siberian Rifle Regiment
4th Siberian Rifle Regiment
1st Siberian Rifle Artillery Brigade

References 

Infantry divisions of the Russian Empire
Military units and formations disestablished in 1918